Depressaria sibirella is a moth in the family Depressariidae. It was described by Alexandr L. Lvovsky in 1981. It is found in the Russian Far East.

References

Moths described in 1981
Depressaria
Moths of Asia